Boris Borisovich Kadomtsev (9 November 1928 – 19 August 1998) was a Soviet and Russian plasma physicist who worked on controlled fusion problems (e.g. tokamaks). He developed a theory of transport phenomena in turbulent plasmas and a theory of the so-called anomalous behavior of plasmas in magnetic fields. In 1966, he discovered plasma instability with trapped particles.

In 1970, Kadomtsev and Vladimir Petviashvili introduced into plasma physics the Kadomtsev–Petviashvili equation (KP equation), a nonlinear partial differential equation with applications in theoretical physics and complex analysis.

Early life and career 
Kadomtsev graduated from Moscow State University in 1951. He then worked at the Institute for Physics and Energy in Obninsk. In 1956, he worked at the Institute for Atomic Energy. In 1976 to 1998, he was chief editor of the journal Physics-Uspekhi.

Since 1973, he has been chair of the plasma physics section of the state committee for the use of nuclear energy.

He died on 19 August 1998 and was buried at Troyekurovskoye Cemetery.

Honors and awards 
In 1970, he received the USSR State Prize for the study of the instability of a high-temperature plasma in a magnetic field and the creation of a method for its stabilization with a “magnetic well”.

In 1984, he was awarded the Lenin Prize for his work on the "Theory of Thermonuclear Toroidal Plasma".

He was also honored with the Order of the Red Banner of Labour. He has been a corresponding member of the Soviet Academy of Sciences since 1962 and a full member since 1970.

In 1998, he received the American Physical Society's James Clerk Maxwell Prize for Plasma Physics for "fundamental contributions to plasma turbulence theory, stability and nonlinear theory of MHD and kinetic instabilities in plasmas, and for international leadership in research and teaching of plasma physics and controlled thermonuclear fusion physics".

Books

References 

1928 births
1998 deaths
Full Members of the Russian Academy of Sciences
Full Members of the USSR Academy of Sciences
Members of the Royal Swedish Academy of Sciences
Moscow State University alumni
Lenin Prize winners
Recipients of the Order of the Red Banner of Labour
Recipients of the USSR State Prize
Plasma physicists
Russian physicists
Soviet physicists
Burials in Troyekurovskoye Cemetery